The 2013 West Coast Conference baseball tournament was held from May 23 through 25 at Banner Island Ballpark in Stockton, California.  It was the first postseason championship event sponsored by the West Coast Conference since 2009, the first such event to be held at a neutral site, and the first to feature more than two teams.  In the championship game, San Diego defeated San Francisco, 2–0, to win its first tournament championship.  As a result, San Diego earned the league's automatic bid to the 2013 NCAA Division I baseball tournament.

Seeding
The top four finishers from the regular season were seeded one through four based on conference winning percentage.  The teams then played a double elimination tournament. However, the championship was a single-elimination game.

Tiebreakers:
x- USD went 3–0 vs. BYU and 2–1 vs. USF to claim the #2 seed
y- BYU went 2–1 vs. USF to claim the #3 seed.

Results

Box Scores

#4 San Francisco vs. #1 Gonzaga

#3 BYU vs. #2 San Diego

#3 BYU vs. #1 Gonzaga

#2 San Diego vs. #4 San Francisco

#3 BYU vs. #2 San Diego

WCC Championship: #4 San Francisco vs. #2 San Diego

All-Tournament Team
The following players were named to the All-Tournament Team.

Most Outstanding Player
Troy Conyers was named Tournament Most Outstanding Player.  Conyers was a pitcher for San Diego who made his first career collegiate start in the championship game, and turned in a complete game shutout to earn the win.  He recorded nine strikeouts while allowing only two hits.

References

West Coast Conference Baseball Championship
West Coast Conference baseball tournament
Tournament
West Coast Conference baseball tournament
Baseball competitions in Stockton, California
College baseball tournaments in California